WVKO-FM (103.1 FM, "La Mega 103.1") is a Spanish radio station playing Spanish Adult Contemporary and some Regional Mexican music. WVKO-FM is licensed by the Federal Communications Commission (FCC) to serve the community of Columbus, Ohio. The station was first licensed, as WWWJ, on July 29, 1975.

According to filings with the FCC, the station ceased broadcasting on May 5, 2006 as the license holder was in bankruptcy.  In January 2007, the station license was transferred to Bernard Ohio LLC.  The FCC granted permission to resume operations on June 19, 2007.

Bernard Radio is a company that operates several radio stations on behalf of the D.B. Zwirn investment fund.  The Zwirn hedge fund was attempting to sell off the radio stations in its portfolio in order to terminate the fund.

WVKO-FM and WVKO were sold to TSJ Radio, LLC effective December 19, 2014 at a price of $743,750.

On March 4, 2019, WVKO-FM was sold to Lazo Media LLC.

On-air staff
Marisela Juarez
Gil Garcia 
Gustavo Aguilar

References

Further reading

External links

VKO-FM
VKO-FM
Radio stations established in 1975
1975 establishments in Ohio